The All-Ireland Senior Hurling Championship 1907 was the 21st series of the All-Ireland Senior Hurling Championship, Ireland's premier hurling knock-out competition.  Kilkenny won the championship, beating Cork 3-12 to 4-8 in the final.

Format

All-Ireland Championship

Semi-finals: (2 matches) The four provincial representatives made up the semi-final pairings.  Two teams are eliminated at this stage while the two winning teams advance to the All-Ireland final.

Final: (1 match) The winners of the two semi-finals contest this game with the winners being declared All-Ireland champions.

Results

Leinster Senior Hurling Championship

Munster Senior Hurling Championship

Ulster Senior Hurling Championship

All-Ireland Senior Hurling Championship

This semi-final was played before the Leinster championship had been decided. When Kilkenny beat Dublin in the Leinster final, they took Dublin's place in the All-Ireland final.

References

Sources

 Corry, Eoghan, The GAA Book of Lists (Hodder Headline Ireland, 2005).
 Donegan, Des, The Complete Handbook of Gaelic Games (DBA Publications Limited, 2005).
 Fullam, Brendan, Captains of the Ash (Wolfhound Press, 2002).

1907